The Queen Street Mall is a pedestrian mall located on Queen Street in the centre of Brisbane, Queensland, Australia. It was intended to bring more people into the central business district.

History

The mall was designed by Robin Gibson (architect). After being closed to traffic in 1981, the initial pedestrian mall was opened by Queen Elizabeth II on 9 August 1982, in order to be ready for the Brisbane Commonwealth Games. Initially, the section of Queen Street between Albert Street and Edward Street was partitioned off to form a pedestrian-only retail precinct, and it was then extended in 1988 to include the section of Queen Street between Albert Street and George Street, timed to coincide with Brisbane's Expo '88. It was designed with an outdoor Victorian style. 

The mall underwent a $25,000,000 refurbishment in 1999, which saw (among other things) the terracotta paving being replaced by granite. The Albert Street section of the mall was refurbished again in 2007. The Brisbane City Council announced in 2009 that Burnett Lane, a narrow laneway that runs between George Street and Albert Street, and parallel to the mall, would be refurbished and integrated into the Queen Street Mall precinct.

2013 siege
On 8 March 2013, the mall was the scene of a 90 minute siege. The offender, Lee Matthew Hillier, had a long criminal history. He was shot several times with non-lethal rounds, ending the incident. He pled guilty to charges including assaulting police and going armed to cause fear. In January 2014 he was sentenced to four-and-a-half years in jail.

Features

There are a number of shopping centres located in the Queen Street Mall, including:
 Wintergarden (opened 1982),
 The Myer Centre (opened 1988),
 Broadway on the Mall (opened 1989),
 Queens Plaza (opened 2005),
 Brisbane Arcade (opened 1923),
 Q&A Building,
 Queen Adelaide Building,
 Tattersall's Arcade

At the intersection of Queen Street and Albert Street at the centre of the mall is a  steel structure designed to provide shade and cover from the weather. An entertainment stage for music, model shows, and other performances is situated near the George Street end of the mall, between the Myer Centre and the Queen Adelaide Building. The stage is covered by an  roof.

Underneath the Queen Street Mall is the Queen Street Bus Station.

In the development of stage one and stage two of the mall, significant heritage-listed building facades were preserved, giving the mall a restored yesteryear feeling.

Shopping centres
There are several significant shopping centres located on the Queen Street Mall. These include the Wintergarden (opened in 1982), The Myer Centre (opened in 1988), Broadway on the Mall (opened in 1989) and the lavish Queens Plaza, situated at the northern end of the mall, which was opened in two stages, the first in 2005, and the second in 2008.
	
The Wintergarden is a three level shopping centre with over 70 specialty stores including a gymnasium, ten pin bowling alley, luxury Hilton hotel, H&M, Zara, Uniqlo and R. M. Williams. In November 2009, it was announced that the Wintergarden will undergo a A$100 million refurbishment in two 12-month stages. The new Wintergarden will once more become of the Brisbane central business district's premier shopping destinations, and an impressive architectural site.
	 
The Myer Centre is the Brisbane CBD's largest shopping centre. It has almost 200 stores spread across 6 floors including Queensland's largest department store, Myer, as well as Target and Birch Carroll and Coyle.
	 
Broadway on the Mall is a four level shopping centre with around 60 stores. It closed in August 2013 for refurbishment and reopened 18 months later.
	
QueensPlaza is the Brisbane CBD's most upmarket shopping centre. It has around 80 stores on three levels including Chanel, Louis Vuitton, Gucci, Dior and Australia's largest single location David Jones department store.

There are other smaller shopping centres and arcades on the Queen Street Mall. These include the historic Brisbane Arcade, the Q&A Building and the heritage Tattersall's Arcade.

Refurbishment
The mall also underwent refurbishment in 1999 from its signature terracotta tile footpath to a grey slate tile footpath, with several significant art commissions and new tree and shrub enclosures (with bench seating) throughout.

Further developments
In 2006, the other end of the George Street engagement with the Mall ('top of the Mall') saw the opening of Brisbane Square which further extended the grey slate tile rendering of the Mall, and, in 2008 extension of the Mall along Albert Street to the corner of Albert Street and Adelaide Street.
	 
The Brisbane City Council announced in 2009 that Burnett Lane, a narrow laneway that runs between George Street and Albert Street, and parallel to the Mall, will be integrated into the Queen Street Mall precinct with a vibrant boutique bar/restaurant scene on the cards.

Management
Management of the mall was originally covered by the Local Government (Queen Street Mall) Act 1981 (Qld), until it was repealed and replaced by the City of Brisbane Act 2010 (Qld).

See also

List of shopping centres in Australia

References

External links

Buildings and structures in Brisbane
Streets in Brisbane
Tourist attractions in Brisbane
Shopping districts and streets in Australia
Pedestrian malls in Australia
History of Brisbane
1982 establishments in Australia
Queen Street, Brisbane
George Street, Brisbane
Edward Street, Brisbane
Albert Street, Brisbane

ms:Queen Street Mall, Brisbane